The National Society of Genetic Counselors (NSGC), founded and incorporated in 1979, is the largest association of genetic counselors with over 3,600 members. Its membership includes genetic counselors and other healthcare professionals working in the field of medical genetics from the United States, Canada, and around the world.

NSCG has a Code of Ethics which provides guidance to the members on the ethical responsibilities of a genetic counselor. This code is reviewed periodically to best represent the current needs of the public and of genetic counselors.  There is also a Conflict of Interest policy, which address possible conflict of interest of members when acting on behalf of NSGC.

There are similar associations, such as the Canadian Association of Genetic Counselors, the Association of Genetic Nurses and Counsellors, the Professional Society of Genetic Counselors in Asia, and the Australasian Society of Genetic Counsellors for those genetic counselors who are currently practicing in Canada, the UK and Ireland, Asia, Australia, and New Zealand, respectively.

NSGC Leadership

The NSGC Board of Directors consists of the President, President-Elect, Secretary/Treasurer, Secretary/Treasurer-Elect, Immediate Past President, Executive Director, and 7 Directors At Large.

Other leadership roles, including the Chair, Vice-Chair, and NSGC Board Liaison positions, can exist within the following committees:

 Access & Service Delivery Committee
Annual Conference Program Committee
Education Committee
Finance Committee
 Marketing & Communications Workgroup
 Membership Committee
 Nominating Committee
Outcomes Committee
Practice Guidelines Committee
Public Policy Committee

Other groups within the NSGC include the Ethics Advisory Group, the Jane Engelberg Memorial Fellowship (JEMF) Advisory Group, and the Audrey Heimler Special Projects Award Committee.

NSGC leadership positions are volunteer roles obtained through member voting, appointment, or self-nomination, depending on the position.

There are several Special Interest Groups (SIG) that provide a smaller group setting for education, consultation, and activity within a specific clinical subspecialty such as Cancer, Cardiovascular, Prenatal, and Public Health.

Policy and Publications 
NSGC advocates on a number of issues related to genetic counseling including support and strategic guidance for state licensure, federal efforts on improving services and professional standing, awareness on cultural competency, as well as various workforce initiatives.

NSGC also maintains a variety of publications regarding the profession and practice of genetic counseling:

 Journal of Genetic Counseling: the official peer-reviewed journal of the National Society of Genetic Counselors, available nationally and internationally.
 Practice guidelines (published since 2015): NSGC practice guidelines are developed by author groups composed of NSGC members and other content experts. Each guideline is based on systematic evidence review. Once approved, practice guidelines are published in peer-reviewed journals. Links to the guidelines will appear here once the guidelines are published. 
Practice Guidelines (published prior to 2015): documents published prior to 2015 as 'practice guidelines' have not gone through the systematic evidence review that is now required by NSGC. These documents include: 
Cancer predisposition evaluation
Consanguinity (Reaffirmed 2014)
Human pedigree nomenclature
 Practice resources: documents that focus on topics of clinical interest, but do not meet NSGC's criteria to be classified as evidence-based Practice Guidelines. These include:
Alzheimer Disease
Cystic Fibrosis
Down Syndrome
Fabry Disease
Fragile X Syndrome
Hereditary Breast and Ovarian Cancer
Prenatal Screening
 Position Statements: reflect concrete applications of the Society’s Code of Ethics and other official documents , are reviewed and updated regularly via membership review and board approval.
 Professional Status Survey: results offer an inside view of the profession, including salary ranges, benefits, work environments, faculty status, and even job satisfaction.
Perspectives in Genetic Counseling: a member-only digital magazine with articles of interest to NSGC members.
 Patient resource website: Genetic counseling-focused web resource developed and maintained by the National Society of Genetic Counselors for use by the general public. 

NSGC provides online resource for patients and the lay community to learn more about genetic disease and genetic counselors through a Patient Resource Site and the NSGC Blog.

Continuing Education 

Continuing education enables genetic counselors to remain current about new technologies and testing modalities, and about relevant psychosocial, ethical, and legal implications. Typically, genetic counselors require a certain number of Continuing Education Units (CEUs) to keep their certification/ licensure active.

NSGC has numerous continuing education programs for genetic counselors through the provision of Continuing Education Units (CEUs) in courses and conferences. CEUs earned through NSGC-approved educational opportunities are accepted by the American Board of Genetic Counseling for purposes of Genetic Counselor recertification.

The NSGC Annual Conference, usually held in the fall in a U.S city, typically offers a certain number of CEUs each year. The conference covers a variety of topics applicable to genetic counselors in a variety of specialties, as well as other healthcare providers. The conference is open to NSGC members, as well as non-members. The 2021 Annual Conference will be held in New Orleans, LA, on September 22–26.

NSGC also offers an Online Education Center with professional courses on topics including Business of Healthcare, Clinical Skills, ELSI and Policy Issues, Professional Development, Technology, and past Conference Recordings.

See also
Genetic Counseling
Journal of Genetic Counseling

References

External links
National Society of Genetic Counselors
American Board of Genetic Counseling
Canadian Association of Genetic Counsellors
Find a Genetic Counselor 
Patient Resource Site

Genetics societies